Calliostoma dentatum is a species of sea snail, a marine gastropod mollusk in the family Calliostomatidae.

Distribution
This species occurs in the Gulf of Mexico off Louisiana and Texas at depths between 12 m and 55 m.

Description 
The maximum recorded shell length is 8.4 mm.

Habitat 
Minimum recorded depth is 12 m. Maximum recorded depth is 55 m.

References

 Quinn, J. F., Jr. 1992. New species of Calliostoma Swainson, 1840 (Gastropoda: Trochidae), and notes on some poorly known species from the Western Atlantic Ocean. Nautilus 106: 77-114
 Rosenberg, G., F. Moretzsohn, and E. F. García. 2009. Gastropoda (Mollusca) of the Gulf of Mexico, pp. 579–699 in Felder, D.L. and D.K. Camp (eds.), Gulf of Mexico–Origins, Waters, and Biota. Biodiversity. Texas A&M Press, College Station, Texas.

External links

dentatum
Gastropods described in 1992